Masjidkur Mosque is one of the archaeological sights of Bangladesh, located in Koyra Upazila of Khulna District. The Kapotaksha River is beside the mosque and very close to the Sundarbans.

History
After the Partition of India in 1947, the mosque was discovered from before the area was full of forests and trees. Later on this excavation was discovered and the mosque below the ground was discovered. There was no inscription found during the discovery of the mosque, and there is no correct idea about its construction time. Masjidkur was named as the mosque was dug from the deep ground. Archaeologists believe that this mosque was most likely made during Khan Jahan Ali's regime as the area was under his rule.

Infrastructure
Each wall of the mosque is about 7 feet wide. It was also constructed in the square with the outer and inner length of 54 and 39 feet respectively. There are three gates in front of the mosque and also four stone pillars made in the interior. There are 9 dome in three rows, including walls and pillars.

See also
 List of mosques in Bangladesh
 List of archaeological sites in Bangladesh

References

Mosque in Khulna District
Archaeological sites in Khulna district